Oscar Gloukh (sometimes Gloch or Gluh, ; born 1 April 2004) is an Israeli professional footballer who plays as an attacking midfielder for Austrian Bundesliga club Red Bull Salzburg and the Israel national team.

Early life 
Gloukh was born and raised in Rehovot, Israel, to his father Maxim Gloukh who immigrated from Russia to Israel at the age of 13.

Club career

Maccabi Tel Aviv
Gloukh made his senior debut with Israeli side Maccabi Tel Aviv on 8 August 2021 at the 1-1 draw against Hapoel Jerusalem at the Israeli Toto Cup (7–6 to Hapoel Jerusalem after penalties). 

On 11 April 2022 he also made his senior Israeli Premier League club line-up debut for Maccabi Tel Aviv at the 1-1 draw against Maccabi Haifa, where he scored his debut senior goal in the 28th minute.

Red Bull Salzburg
On 27 January 2023, Gloukh signed a 4.5-year contract with Austrian Bundesliga club Red Bull Salzburg.

International career
Gloukh has capped for the Israel under-19 team since 2021, and took part in its qualification to the 2022 UEFA European Under-19 Championship for the second time in its history. Gloukh scored 4 goals (third best goalscorer) and made 2 assists, including a goal in the final against England, a match which ended in a 1–3 defeat after extra time. Gloukh was named as one of the championship's best performers by ESPN, and was named in UEFA's team of the tournament., and his goal in the final won the goal of the tournament.

Gloukh also plays for the Israel under-21 team, making his debut on 2 June 2022, and took part in its qualification to the 2023 UEFA European Under-21 Championship for the third time in its history.

In November 2022, Gloukh was called up to play for the Israel senior team ahead of its friendly matches against Zambia and Cyprus. On 17 November 2022 he made his debut for the senior national team coming in as a substitute in the 59th minute in the friendly match against Zambia which ended in a 4–2 victory. On 20 November 2022 he started in the friendly match against Cyprus and scored his first goal for the national team, a match that ended in a 2–3 defeat.

International goals

Career statistics

Club

See also
List of Israelis

External links 

Profile at the Maccabi Tel-Aviv F.C. website
Profile at the Israel Football Association website
 ESPN.com: European U19 Championship men's stars, June 26, 2022
 UEFA.com: 2022 Under-19 EURO finals: Who was the top scorer?, July 1, 2022
 UEFA.com: 2022 Under-19 EURO Team of the Tournament, July 5, 2022
 UEFA.com: Oscar Gloukh wins 2022 Under-19 EURO Goal of the Tournament, July 5, 2022

References

2004 births
Living people
Israeli footballers
Footballers from Rehovot
Maccabi Tel Aviv F.C. players
FC Red Bull Salzburg players
Israeli Premier League players
Austrian Football Bundesliga players
Israel international footballers
Israel under-21 international footballers
Israel youth international footballers
Israeli expatriate footballers
Expatriate footballers in Austria
Israeli expatriate sportspeople in Austria
Association football midfielders
Israeli people of Soviet descent
Israeli people of Russian descent